James Ray Jones (May 6, 1935 – October 5, 1982) was an American football defensive back who played one season with the Los Angeles Rams of the National Football League (NFL). He was drafted by the Los Angeles Rams in the third round of the 1958 NFL Draft. He played college football at the University of Washington. Jones was also a member of the BC Lions and Oakland Raiders.

Early years
Jones played high school football at Lincoln High School in Tacoma, Washington, earning all-state honors as a fullback.

College career
Jones played for the Washington Huskies from 1956 to 1957, recording career totals of 852 rushing yards and two rushing touchdowns. He earned First-team All-PCC honors and was co-captain of the Huskies his senior year in 1957. He was invited to the Chicago College All-Star Game in 1958.

Professional career
Jones was selected by the Los Angeles Rams with the 30th pick in the 1958 NFL Draft. He played in twelve games for the Rams during the 1958 season. He played in fifteen games for the BC Lions from 1960 to 1961. Jones played in one game for the Oakland Raiders in 1961.

Personal life
Jones died on October 5, 1982 in King County, Washington after a scuba diving accident near Seattle. He was an insurance agent for Allstate at the time of his death.

References

External links
Just Sports Stats
College stats

1935 births
1982 deaths
Players of American football from Texas
American football defensive backs
American football fullbacks
Canadian football running backs
Canadian football defensive backs
African-American players of American football
African-American players of Canadian football
Washington Huskies football players
Los Angeles Rams players
BC Lions players
Oakland Raiders players
20th-century American businesspeople
American businesspeople in insurance
Insurance agents
African-American businesspeople
Businesspeople from Texas
Sportspeople from Waco, Texas
Accidental deaths in Washington (state)
Underwater diving deaths
American Football League players
20th-century African-American sportspeople